Comics International was a British news and reviews magazine about comic books. Founded in 1990, it was published monthly by Quality Communications until 2006, and then by Cosmic Publications Ltd. until 2010.

Over time, Comics International became quite popular, often outselling the very comics it covered. Being so comprehensive in content, Comics International was carried by many leading UK reference libraries. The magazine was given the National Comics Award for "Best Specialist Comics Publication" four times in six years.

Overview
Described in Time Out as the NME of comics, Comics International provided up-to-date news and reviews of comics from around the world. There was a particular focus upon the British comics scene, including British comics creators, conventions and comics-related events, and information on British comics retailers. Comics International featured a question-and-answer section with responses by comics experts, as well as a lively letters page.

Originally printed in black-and-white on newsprint, the magazine later featured full-colour glossy covers with interior colour pages.

History 
The magazine was published and edited by Quality Communications owner Dez Skinn for its first two hundred issues, from 1990 to 2006 (Skinn's Dez Sez column appeared in each issue during this time).

With the magazine's sale to Cosmic Publications in 2006 (and Skinn's departure as editor), news editor Mike Conroy was promoted to editor with issue #201. Conroy had taken over the main news section of the magazine in 1997 from Phill Hall. Conroy announced a new direction for the magazine under his editorship:

After the editorial changeover, however, the magazine's frequency became increasingly sporadic, casting doubt on its long-term future under the new editorial team. In May 2010, Cosmic Publications was dissolved, thus confirming that Comics International had ended, after publishing only eight regular issues (and a few specials) under its new regime.

Regular features
In addition to Dez Skinn's own editorial column, Comics International's main features included:

 Frame to Frame, a long-running column by Mike Conroy on the interaction between movies and comics
 Talking Shop, a column about British comics retailing by Stephen Holland, owner of Page 45
 It's Only a Comic, a humorous column from the creator's side by Tony Lee
 Novel Graphics, a column about graphic novels by Paul Gravett; this column originated in Borderline magazine
 Networks, Internet comics gossip by Tim Pilcher; Pilcher went on to become associate editor of CI
 Illuminations, upcoming news of future comic releases by Martin Averre
 Movers & Shakers, the comics industry's first gossip and marketing column; voted the magazine's most popular column in a poll conducted in 1997. Created by former Comics International news and features editor Phill Hall
 Hotshots, a top ten picks column originally by Phil Hall and later by Martin Averre
 The World of Jack Staff, a serialised comic strip by Paul Grist
 Comic Cuts, by Mike Kazybrid, a three-panel gag strip
 Outside the Frame, by John Freeman/Nick Miller, a three-panel gag strip

In addition, there was a lengthy review section by a regular team of over twenty reviewers, a festivals calendar, and listings of U.K. comics specialty stores, mail-order companies, and the following month's U.K. & U.S. releases.

Awards 
 1997 National Comics Award for Best Specialist Comics Publication
 1999 National Comics Award for Best Specialist Comics Publication
 2001 National Comics Award for Best Specialist Magazine or Website
 2003 National Comics Award for Best Specialist Magazine or Website

See also 
 Comics Buyer's Guide
 Wizard

Notes

External links
 Comics International at Dez Skinn website
 Comics International forum at DownTheTubes

1990 establishments in the United Kingdom
2010 disestablishments in the United Kingdom
Comics magazines published in the United Kingdom
Defunct magazines published in the United Kingdom
Magazines about comics
Magazines established in 1990
Magazines disestablished in 2010
Monthly magazines published in the United Kingdom
Visual arts magazines published in the United Kingdom